Cristian Camilo Ojeda Rubio (born 5 June 1985) is a Colombian former professional footballer who played as a midfielder.

Career
Ojeda joined Valledupar in 2011, subsequently making his debut on 30 January in a Categoría Primera B defeat to Atlético Bucaramanga - he was sent off with nine minutes remaining. Ojeda's first goal for the club came in the following September against Atlético. In total, Ojeda played seventy times and scored five goals for Valledupar in all competitions. On 30 June 2012, Categoría Primera A side Real Cartagena signed Ojeda. A month later, his professional bow arrived during a match with Once Caldas. He featured in seven fixtures in 2012 which ended with relegation. In 2015, Ojeda agreed to play for Cortuluá.

However, he departed Cortuluá months later after just one appearance - in a Copa Colombia win versus Deportivo Cali on 18 February 2015. He had a short spell with Categoría Primera B's Llaneros to end 2015.

Personal life
Upon retiring, Ojeda teamed up with fellow former footballers Alonso Acosta and Diego Carmona to teach and develop younger players in and around Montería, Colombia.

Career statistics

References

External links

1985 births
Living people
People from Montería
Colombian footballers
Association football midfielders
Categoría Primera B players
Categoría Primera A players
Valledupar F.C. footballers
Real Cartagena footballers
Cortuluá footballers
Llaneros F.C. players